Mesovagus is a genus of rattails found in Indian and Pacific Ocean.

Species
There are currently 2 recognized species in this genus:
 Mesovagus antipodum (C. L. Hubbs & Iwamoto, 1977) (Bathypelagic rattail)
 Mesovagus berryi (C. L. Hubbs & Iwamoto, 1977) (Berry's grenadier)

References

Macrouridae